Torworth is a small village on the A638 or 'Great North Road' in North Nottinghamshire. According to the 2001 census it had a population of 264, falling marginally to 263 at the 2011 census.

References

Sources
 Torworth village website

External links

Villages in Nottinghamshire
Civil parishes in Nottinghamshire
Bassetlaw District